Nišići is a village in the municipality of Ilijaš, situated north from Sarajevo, Bosnia and Herzegovina, on a highland karst plateau with a same name.

Nature park Bijambare
The region of Nišići within areal of Bijambare is a karst enclave with all its commonly observed characteristics and features: caves, lost rivers, intriguing funnel-shaped depressions and rocky massifs. The five caves are located in three horizons, and a 50 meters high waterfall nearby.
Well known for its karstic features, part of the Nišići plateau around Bijambare is designated nature park, Bijambare Nature Park, and is important tourist and speleological destination.

Demographics 
According to the 2013 census, its population was 48.

References

Populated places in Ilijaš
Nišići plateau